Ahmad Saad Abdullah is a Saudi Arabian football player who played in the Saudi Professional League.

External links

2009-10 Profile at slstat.com
2010-11 Profile at slstat.com
2011-12 Profile at slstat.com
2012-13 Profile at slstat.com

Living people
Saudi Arabian footballers
Al Nassr FC players
Al-Wehda Club (Mecca) players
Al-Raed FC players
Ettifaq FC players
Al-Shoulla FC players
Saudi Professional League players
1984 births
Association football defenders